The following articles contain lists of recessions:

List of recessions in the United Kingdom
List of recessions in the United States

Economy-related lists